Mayfield Baptist Chapel, also known as Mayfield Strict Baptist Chapel, is a place of worship for Gospel Standard Strict Baptists in the village of Mayfield, part of the Wealden District of East Sussex, England.  The present chapel was built in 1873 on the site of a predecessor which had opened some years before—possibly as early as the late 18th century.  A Strict Baptist church was formally constituted in 1871 when the minister at the time, Eli Page, adopted these views; previously it had simply been a "preaching place" serving Christians with various Protestant Nonconformist views.  The simple Vernacular-style building remains in use as a Strict Baptist chapel.

History
East Sussex was a hotbed of Protestant Nonconformity from the 17th century, and a form of Calvinist doctrine "explicitly rooted in 16th-century puritanism" was particularly significant in the county.  The village of Mayfield was unusual for its "strong Roman Catholic atmosphere": Catholicism "was all but extinct" in East Sussex by 1780, and the few adherents "were viewed with suspicion and were carefully watched".  Nevertheless, Nonconformity had a presence by around 1830, or possibly as early as the late 18th century or early 19th century, when a chapel was built at the junction of West Street and South Street.  (A date of 1815 has also been suggested, and the 1851 religious census gives 1801 as the date of foundation.)  It was independent and Calvinistic in style, not being affiliated with any Nonconformist denomination at this time; it was instead built by a local man, Mr Stone, as a "preaching place" for a minister called William Burch who had previously ministered in Staplehurst, Kent.  The terms of Stone's will required the chapel "to be maintained until the death of Burch".  Burch died in 1863, and the chapel was closed; it was then put up for sale in June 1865.  A local man who wished to see the chapel reopened bought it for £85 and called Eli Page to the ministry.  Page's theological views changed over the next few years: initially denominationally independent, he became a Strict Baptist in 1871 and constituted a church along those lines in the same year.  Other Strict Baptist visiting ministers had also preached at the chapel since 1866.

A baptistery was constructed in 1871, but the old chapel was structurally unsound and had to be dismantled.  Some land next to the chapel was available, so the building was rebuilt on a larger scale and reopened on 9 May 1873.  It is a plain Vernacular building with a rendered façade and a datestone in the gable.

The doctrinal shift from independent Calvinism towards Strict Baptist theology was common locally.  "Many—even a majority of—Strict Baptist causes in Sussex have Independent origins", often prompted by the appointment of a new pastor or, as in Mayfield's case, the conversion to Strict Baptist beliefs of the incumbent.  At the time of the 1851 religious census, Mayfield Chapel—like many other independent Calvinistic chapels in Sussex—described itself simply as "Independent", a description which was also associated with chapels which later became Congregationalist.

Administration and services
On 22 September 1875, with the name Baptist Chapel, the chapel was registered for worship in accordance with the Places of Worship Registration Act 1855. Six days later it was also registered for the solemnisation of marriages in accordance with the Marriage Act 1836.

Services are held on Sunday mornings and evenings, and there is a weekly prayer meeting on Tuesday evenings.  The chapel has no pastor, so ministers visit from other chapels and lead services.  A Selection of Hymns for Public Worship, a Gospel Standard Strict Baptist hymnbook compiled by William Gadsby, is used at some services.  A Eucharistic service is held once a month.

1851 census return
The return was supplied by Nicholas Stone, describing himself as "owner", and is described as "Independent Chapel": "a house converted into a Chapel about the year 1801 and enlarged in the year 1835".  All sittings were free (not subject to pew rents), and services were held once a month on Sunday mornings and afternoons and, separately, once a month on Sunday evenings.  Estimated attendances for the morning and afternoon services were "between 300 and 400"; for the evening services, "between 80 and 150".

See also
List of current places of worship in Wealden
List of Strict Baptist churches

References

Bibliography

Baptist churches in East Sussex
Churches completed in 1873
Mayfield, East Sussex